Robinson & Price was a British automobile manufacturer based in Liverpool (Lancashire) from 1905 to 1914.

In 1905 and 1906 two models were manufactured - a 6 ½ hp with a single-cylinder engine, and a 10/12 hp with a two-cylinder engine. The success was low, and only small numbers were built.

In 1913, the company introduce a single-cylinder model, the 6/8 hp. Production ended at the start of the First World War in 1914.

References

Sources 
 Harald Linz und Halwart Schrader: Die Internationale Automobil-Enzyklopädie. United Soft Media Verlag GmbH, München 2008, .
 Nick Georgano: The Beaulieu Encyclopedia of the Automobile, Volume 3 P–Z. Fitzroy Dearborn Publishers, Chicago 2001,  (englisch).
 David Culshaw & Peter Horrobin: The Complete Catalogue of British Cars 1895–1975. Veloce Publishing plc. Dorchester (1999). .

Defunct motor vehicle manufacturers of England
Defunct companies based in Liverpool